Jazzland is a 1928 American silent drama film directed by Dallas M. Fitzgerald and starring Bryant Washburn, Vera Reynolds and Carroll Nye.

Cast
 Bryant Washburn as Ernest Hallam 
 Vera Reynolds as Stella Baggott 
 Carroll Nye as Homer Pew 
 Forrest Stanley as Hamilton Pew 
 Virginia Lee Corbin as Martha Baggott 
 Violet Bird as Kitty Pew 
 Carl Stockdale as Joe Bitner 
 Edward Cecil as Wilbraham 
 George Ralph as Nedick 
 Nicholas Caruso as Jackson 
 Florence Turner as Mrs. Baggott 
 Richard Belfield as Mr. Baggott

References

Bibliography
 Munden, Kenneth White. The American Film Institute Catalog of Motion Pictures Produced in the United States, Part 1. University of California Press, 1997.

External links
 

1928 films
1928 drama films
1920s English-language films
American silent feature films
Silent American drama films
Films directed by Dallas M. Fitzgerald
American black-and-white films
1920s American films